Khoriya (खोरिया) is a village in the Solukhumbu District of Nepal. It lies to the northeast of Kathmandu, in between Jiri and Lukla. It is a home of the Sherpa people. There is a primary school, a health post and two Gompa (monasteries) in the center of the village: Samten Chholing Gompa (Rato gompa) and Seto Gompa. Both monasteries are Nyingma Sect of Tibetan Buddhism. The village is near Salleri (सल्लेरी), which is the headquarters of the Solukhumbu district in the Sagarmatha Zone of eastern Nepal.

Transportation 
The most common ways to reach the Khoriya village from Kathmandu are by (a) taking a jeep direct from Kathmandu to Salleri approximately 8 to 9 hours and a 1-hour walk (b) flying to Phaplu and a 2-hour walk, (c) taking a bus to Jiri and 3 days' walk (d) flying to Lukla and a 3-day walk.

References

External links

Populated places in Solukhumbu District